Doktor Spira i Ljudska Bića (trans. Doctor Spira and the Human Beings) were a Serbian new wave/alternative rock band from Belgrade. They were a prominent act of the Yugoslav new wave scene.

Formed in the late 1970s by Dušan Mihajlović "Spira" (acoustic guitar, vocals), who had already gained prominence on the Yugoslav acoustic rock scene, Doktor Spira i Ljudska Bića were a part of the Yugoslav new wave scene. Despite Spirić's cult status on the Belgrade scene, Dijagnoza was refused by major Yugoslav record labels, so Mihajlović self-released the album in 1981. Doktor Spira i Ljudska Bića disbanded in 1985. A year later, the band's debut album was reissued by PGP-RTB, and in 1987 Mihajlović recorded another album, which remained unreleased until 2007. In 2007, the band's debut and previously unreleased second studio album were released together on the compilation album Arheološki artefakti tehnofilskih civilizacija prošlosti ili naučna fantastika kao žanr u umetničkim delima s kraja dvadesetog veka, and Doktor Spira i Ljudska Bića reunited for several live pefrormances.

History

Spirić's early career, band formation (1972–1979)
The singer-songwriter Dušan Mihajlović "Spira" started his musical career during the late 1972 in an acoustic rock duo called Mira i Spira (Mira and Spira), featuring Spirić on guitar and vocals and Mirjana "Mira" Marković on vocals. After a series of performances on Belgrade happenings and concerts, especially the ones organized by Pop Mašina members in the Belgrade Sports Hall, Mihajlović achieved a major affirmation after the inclusion of his song "Prvi sneg" ("The First Snow") into the repertoire of the acoustic rock band Suncokret, being eventually released on their debut album Moje bube (My Bugs) in 1977.

During the late 1970s, Mihajlović had given up the acoustic sound, turning towards the current trends of the time, the upcoming new wave music, forming the band Doktor Spira i Ljudska Bića, which in its initial period had changed numerous lineups.

Album recording, disbandment (1980–1985)
In 1980, the lineup consisting of Mihajlović (vocals, acoustic guitar), Zoran Dašić (guitar), Stevan Milinković (bass guitar) and Želimir Vasić (drums) recorded the debut album Dijagnoza (Diagnosis). The album, produced by Mihajlović himself, featured the unusual and original songs "Buđenje" ("The Awakening"), "Ima dana kada mene moja duša boli" ("There Are Days When My Soul is Aching"), "Dr. Paranoja" ("Dr. Paranoia"), "Uvek isto zbogom" ("Always the Same Farewell"), and "Igrač na žici" ("Tightrope Dancer"), bearing a strong narrative notion of alienation. Recorded at the Enco Lesić's Druga maca studio in Belgrade and mastered at the Trident studio in London, the album featured guest appearance by Mirjana Marković on backing vocals and former DAG member Dragan Popović, the latter being a co-writer of the song "Psychoneu Rosis".

At the time, Mihajlović enjoyed a cult status among the audience, however, this did not affect the major Yugoslav record labels to release the album. Since he could not find a publisher among Yugoslav labels, during 1981, Mihajlović went to London and financed himself the printing of 50 copies of the album, which he brought to Belgrade and distributed to his friends. The LP had a white paper cover without any images and the track listing was written by hand. The album promotion of the exclusive album release was held in December 1981 at the Atelje 212 theatre. The band continued performing the material, enjoying cult status among audience and musicians alike—in 1982, Momčilo Bajagić, at the time Riblja Čorba guitarist, later the leader of Bajaga i Instruktori, named Dijagnoza one of his ten most favourite albums—until 1985, when they disbanded.

Post-breakup 
In 1986, an editor for the PGP-RTB record label had become pop rock musician Oliver Mandić. In a discussion at a local bistro with Bora Đorđević, frontman o the hard rock band Riblja Čorba, Mandić claimed that he, as the new editor, would bring changes to PGP-RTB. Đorđević, annoyed with Mandić's statements, made a bet with him to release Dijagnoza. Without any promotion, the album was released in a minimal printing of 2,000 copies, and quickly sold out. At the time Mihajlović had quit performing and constructed a mini metal guitar and mini wooden bass guitar amp under the Žuto pile (Yellow Chicken) brand name. However, despite trying to make a breakthrough on the music equipment market, it turned out to be unsuccessful.

In 1987, Mihajlović secretly recorded the second studio album, Dizajn za stvarni svet (A Real World Design), featuring diverse musical influences which could stylistically be called world music, even though the expression was not used at the time, combined with krautrock, gothic rock, dance music, boogie, jazz and atonal music. Following the musical and production trends of the time, Mihajlović retained the same lyrical style on the new material as on Dijagnoza, sung under the domestic influences of such vocalists as Milan Mladenović and Vlada Divljan. The album would, however, remain unreleased until 2007. In 1988, he had moved to London and dedicated himself to business with computers.

Reunion (2007) 
In 2006, Mihajlović started remastering the album Dijagnoza and the album Dizajn za stvarni svet, which were rereleased on CD by Multimedia Records in 2007 on the deluxe compilation album Arheološki artefakti tehnofilskih civilizacija prošlosti ili naučna fantastika kao žanr u umetničkim delima s kraja dvadesetog veka (The Archeological Artifacts of the Past Technophilic Civilizations or Science Fiction as a Genre in the Late Twentieth Century Artistic Works).

During October of the same year, Mihajlović made several live appearances in Belgrade with Doktor Spira i Ljudska Bića in a new lineup which, beside him, featured the former member Predrag Milanović (bass guitar), Predrag Kozomara (guitars), Aleksandar Miletić (keyboards), Slobodan Jurišić (drums), Ana Milanović (backing vocals) and Sanja Bogosavljević (backing vocals). Special guest appearances included Emily Jane Sarić (vocals) and Dragan Popović's Mitropa Music Project from Sweden.

Legacy 
The song "Ima dana kada mene moja duša boli" was covered by singer Bilja Krstić on her solo album Iz unutrašnjeg džepa, released by PGP-RTB in 1985. The garage rock band Kazna Za Uši on one of their first recordings paid a tribute to the band with the lines "Devojčice tvoja majka stvarno nije imala sreće..." ("Little girl, your mother was really out of luck..."), taken from the song of the same name.

The lyrics of 4 songs by the band were featured in Petar Janjatović's book Pesme bratstva, detinjstva & potomstva: Antologija ex YU rok poezije 1967 - 2007 (Songs of Brotherhood, Childhood & Offspring: Anthology of Ex YU Rock Poetry 1967 – 2007).

Discography

Studio albums 
 Dijagnoza (1986)

Compilation albums 
Arheološki artefakti tehnofilskih civilizacija prošlosti ili naučna fantastika kao žanr u umetničkim delima s kraja dvadesetog veka (2007)

See also 
New wave music in Yugoslavia

References

External links 
 Doktor Spira i Ljudska Bića at Discogs
 Doktor Spira i Ljudska Bića at Prog Archives

Serbian rock music groups
Serbian new wave musical groups
Serbian post-punk music groups
Serbian alternative rock groups
Serbian art rock groups
Serbian experimental musical groups
Yugoslav rock music groups
Yugoslav art rock groups
Musical groups from Belgrade
Musical groups established in 1979
Musical groups disestablished in 1985
Musical groups reestablished in 2007